Badluarach is a small village on the south shore of Little Loch Broom, in Wester Ross in the Highland council area of Scotland. Badluarach is at the end of a minor road, which joins to the A832 road.

A small ferry crosses from Badluarach to the community of Scoraig, on the opposite side of Little Loch Broom. There are no roads into Scoraig, the only way in is by boat or several miles walk.

References

Populated places in Ross and Cromarty